Magomed Dzhamaldinovich Muslimov (born 3 February 1992) is a Russian former football midfielder.

Club career
He made his debut in the Russian Second Division for FC Dagdizel Kaspiysk on 12 July 2013 in a game against FC Taganrog.
 
He made his Russian Football National League debut for FC Anzhi Makhachkala on 30 May 2015 in a game against FC Sakhalin Yuzhno-Sakhalinsk.

References

External links
 
 Career summary by sportbox.ru

1992 births
Living people
Russian footballers
Association football midfielders
FC Anzhi Makhachkala players
Sportspeople from Makhachkala